Jeffrey Ching (born 4 November 1965) is a contemporary classical composer. He was born in the Philippines, to Chinese parents. He is married with the operatic soprano Andión Fernández and has two children.

His opera  was given in the Theater Erfurt in 2009.

Selected works
Concerto da camera
Horologia sinica
Kunstkabinett
Notas para una cartografía de Filipinas
Terra Kytaorum
Symphony No. 1 in C major (prem. 1981)
Symphony No. 2, "The Imp of the Perverse"
Symphony No. 3, "Rituals"
Symphony No. 4, "Souvenir des Ming"
Symphony No. 5, "Kunstkammer"

References

Further reading 

 Hila, Antonio C.  "Understanding the Early Music of Jeffrey Ching: An Erudite Composer", Unitas, Vol. 75, No. 3, Sept. 2002, pp. 454–75.  ISSN 0041-7149
 Programme brochure for Weltblech concert, Berlin, 9 January 2001.
 Programme brochure for the Kammerorchester Berlin IV. Abonnementkonzert, Berlin, 1 March 2006.
 Xu, Jing (徐靜).  "Zhuang Zuxin: Meilidi xuanlü rensheng" (庄祖欣: 美丽的旋律人生), Guangming ribao (光明日報), 15 September 2006.
 Orosa, Rosalinda L. "Ching Amazes", The Philippine Star, 28 October 2006.
 Programme brochure for Shanghai Philharmonic Orchestra concert, Shanghai International Arts Festival, 17 November 2006.
 Orosa, Rosalinda L. "Jeffrey Ching: An Update", The Philippine Star, 28 July 2007.
 Programme brochure for the Modern Art Ensemble concert Soundbridges—Neue Musik: Südostasien und Taiwan, Berlin, 16 September 2007.
 Programme brochure for the concert "Zwischen Orient und Okzident: Musikalische Anverwandlungen (3)", Münster, 30 September 2008.

External links

20th-century classical composers
21st-century classical composers
Filipino classical composers
Living people
1965 births